NYOW may refer to:
 National Youth Orchestra of Wales
 New York, Ontario and Western Railway